In geometry, the small dodecahemidodecahedron is a nonconvex uniform polyhedron, indexed as . It has 18 faces (12 pentagons and 6 decagons), 60 edges, and 30 vertices. Its vertex figure alternates two regular pentagons and decagons as a crossed quadrilateral.

It is a hemipolyhedron with six decagonal faces passing through the model center.

Related polyhedra 

It shares its edge arrangement with the icosidodecahedron (its convex hull, having the pentagonal faces in common), and with the small icosihemidodecahedron (having the decagonal faces in common).

References

External links 
 
 Uniform polyhedra and duals

Uniform polyhedra